The 1904 Major League Baseball season was contested from April 14 to October 10, 1904. The Boston Americans and New York Giants finished atop the standings for the American League and National League, respectively. There was no postseason, as the Giants declined to meet the Americans in a World Series.

Regular-season schedules were increased this season from 140 games to 154 games, with each team now playing the other seven teams in the same league 22 times apiece; this scheduling would be used through the 1918 season.

The St. Louis Browns and Detroit Tigers played 11 consecutive games against each other in September—the first six in Detroit and the final five in St. Louis—the most games played consecutively between two teams in major league history.

Standings

American League

National League

League leaders

No-hitters
 May 5 – Cy Young
 August 17 – Jesse Tannehill

Postseason
No postseason was held this year.

Managers

American League

National League

Events
May 30 – Frank Chance of the Chicago Cubs is hit by a pitch five times in a double header.

References

ESPN

External links
1904 in baseball history from ThisGreatGame.com
1904 Major League Baseball season schedule at Baseball Reference

 
Major League Baseball seasons